North America's Building Trades Unions (NABTU) is a labor federation of 14 North American unions in the building trade, founded by the American Federation of Labor in 1907.

History
North America's Building Trades Unions was founded by the American Federation of Labor (AFL) at its November 1907 Convention in Norfolk, Virginia as a Department of Building Trades. In 1937, its name was changed to Building and Construction Trade Department of the American Federation of Labor--Congress of Industrial Organizations.

Affiliates
North America's Building Trades Unions is a labor federation of 14 North American unions in the building trade. affiliates are the International Brotherhood of Electrical Workers (IBEW), International Brotherhood of Teamsters (Teamsters), International Union of Bricklayers and Allied Craftworkers (BAC), International Union of Elevator Constructors (IUEC), International Union of Painters and Allied Trades (IUPAT), Laborers’ International Union of North America (LIUNA), Operative Plasterers’ and Cement Masons’ International Association (OPCMIA), International Association of Sheet Metal, Air, Rail and Transportation Workers (SMART), United Association – Union of Plumbers, Fitters, Welders and Service Techs (UA), United Union of Roofers, Waterproofers and Allied Workers (Union Roofers), International Union of Operating Engineers (IUOE), International Brotherhood of Boilermakers, Iron Ship Builders, Blacksmiths, Forgers and Helpers (Boilermakers), International Association of Heat and Frost Insulators and Allied Workers (Insulators), International Association of Bridge, Structural, Ornamental and Reinforcing Iron Workers (IW) and The Canadian Building Trades Unions (CBTU)

NABTU has labor management committees with workers in the biopharmaceutical industry, the oil and natural gas industries and the U.S. chemical industry.

Organization
The federation is organized in state, provincial and local councils. , its funding consisted of an initiation fee, a per capita tax of 70 cents per member per month, an annual levy, agreements negotiated, sale of supplies and assessments.

 Sean McGarvey has been President and Brent Brooker Secretary-Treasurer of the NABTU.

Purpose
The NABTU was founded as a way to overcome the jurisdictional conflicts occurring in the building and construction trade unions. It was largely unsuccessful in this task; conflict ended only after the Taft–Hartley Act largely outlawed jurisdictional strikes.

The NABTU coordinates the activity of building and construction trade unions belonging to the AFL–CIO by establishing jurisdictional rules, coordinating how work is assigned at construction sites, mediating jurisdictional and work assignment disputes, and coordinating interaction between the AFL–CIO's construction unions and employers. It also coordinates the efforts of local unions in the building trades, including contract negotiations with employer organizations and apprenticeship and training programs.

The NABTU also conducts research into construction workplace health and safety issues. It lobbies the United States Congress and executive branch agencies (such as the Occupational Safety and Health Administration) on health, safety, wages (e.g., the Davis–Bacon Act of 1931), and other legislative and regulatory issues. The organization also helps its affiliate unions establish, coordinate and uphold minimum educational standards for apprenticeship and journeyman training programs.

The NABTU´s purpose is described in 13 sections as coordination, organization and formation of local councils, apprenticeship training, health and safety practices, dispute resolution and jurisdiction, engagement with industry, negotiations of wage and working conditions, legislative activity, research and public communications helping members to become elected officials.

Political positions
NABTU criticized President Obama´s 2015 initiative of a tax-funded apprenticeship program, saying it was already doing its own.

In April 2016, NABTU and the presidents of eight building trade unions called on the AFL–CIO to cut its ties with environmentalist Tom Steyer, who founded NextGen America Climate Action, a super PAC to "prevent climate disaster and transition to clean energies", opposing fossil fuel pipelines.

In April 2017, NABTU President McGarvey applauded Donald Trump’s plans for the Keystone Pipeline and other infrastructure projects, when Trump spoke at NABTU´s 2017 legislative convention.

NABTU offered a $200,000 reward for information about hanging a noose at the Y-12 Uranium Processing Facility construction site in Oakridge
as nooses on construction sites had become common after George Floyd´s death with more than 20 nooses and other racist incidents on jobsites in 2020 alone.

Presidents
1908: James Kirby
1910: James A. Short
1913:John Donlin
1924: George F. Hendrick
1926: William J. McSorley
1936: J. W. Williams
1937: Joseph McInerney
1939: John Coyne
1946: Richard Gray
1960: Joseph Haggerty
1971: Frank Bonadio
1974: Robert Georgine
2000: Edward Sullivan
2008: Mark Ayers
2012: Sean McGarvey

References

Archives
 Building & Construction Trades Council (Seattle, Wash.) records. 1959-1974. 4 cubic ft. (4 boxes). At the Labor Archives of Washington, University of Washington Libraries Special Collections.

External links

Trade unions in the United States
Trade unions in Canada
1907 establishments in the United States
Building and construction trade unions
Trade unions established in 1907